Nepenthes tomoriana (after Tomori Bay, from which the type originates) is a species of pitcher plant endemic to  Sulawesi, where it grows at an elevation of 0–500 m above sea level.

Natural hybrids

N. mirabilis × N. tomoriana

References

Further reading

 Bauer, U., C.J. Clemente, T. Renner & W. Federle 2012. Form follows function: morphological diversification and alternative trapping strategies in carnivorous Nepenthes pitcher plants. Journal of Evolutionary Biology 25(1): 90–102. 
  Mansur, M. 2001.  In: Prosiding Seminar Hari Cinta Puspa dan Satwa Nasional. Lembaga Ilmu Pengetahuan Indonesia, Bogor. pp. 244–253.
 McPherson, S.R. & A. Robinson 2012. Field Guide to the Pitcher Plants of Sulawesi. Redfern Natural History Productions, Poole.
 Meimberg, H., P. Dittrich, G. Bringmann, J. Schlauer & G. Heubl 2000. Molecular phylogeny of Caryophyllidae s.l. based on matK sequences with special emphasis on carnivorous taxa. Plant Biology 2(2): 218–228. 
 Meimberg, H., A. Wistuba, P. Dittrich & G. Heubl 2001. Molecular phylogeny of Nepenthaceae based on cladistic analysis of plastid trnK intron sequence data. Plant Biology 3(2): 164–175. 
  Meimberg, H. 2002.  Ph.D. thesis, Ludwig Maximilian University of Munich, Munich.
 Meimberg, H. & G. Heubl 2006. Introduction of a nuclear marker for phylogenetic analysis of Nepenthaceae. Plant Biology 8(6): 831–840. 

Carnivorous plants of Asia
tomoriana
Endemic flora of Sulawesi
Plants described in 1928
Taxa named by Benedictus Hubertus Danser